Tulisa (born 1988) is a British singer.

Tulisa may also refer to:

 Tulisa, the Wood-Cutter's Daughter, an Indian legend
 Tulișa River, in Romania
 Tulișa, a mountain in Uricani, Romania

See also
Tulasa Thapa